The Oricon Albums Chart is the Japanese music industry standard albums popularity chart issued daily, weekly, monthly and yearly by Oricon. Oricon originally published LP, CT, Cartridge and CD charts prior to the establishment of the Oricon Albums Chart on October 5, 1987. The Oricon Albums Chart's rankings are based on physical albums' sales. Oricon did not include download sales until its establishment of the Digital Albums Chart on November 19, 2016. In November 2018, Oricon began to include streaming in its album rankings, introducing a combined album chart based on album-equivalent units. 

Charts are published every Tuesday in Oricon Style and on Oricon's official website. Every Monday, Oricon receives data from outlets, but data on merchandise sold through certain channels does not make it into the charts. For example, the debut single of NEWS, a pop group, was released only through 7-Eleven stores, which are not covered by Oricon, and its sales were not reflected in the Oricon charts. Oricon's rankings of record sales are therefore not completely accurate.

Best-selling albums of all time

See also 
 List of Oricon number-one albums
 Oricon Singles Chart
 List of best-selling singles in Japan
 List of best-selling albums in Japan

References

External links 
 Oricon website 
 
 

Japanese record charts
Oricon